Pieter Crijnse Volmarijn (1629–1679) was a Dutch Golden Age painter.

Biography
Volmarijn was born and died in Rotterdam.  According to the RKD he was a pupil of Hendrik Martensz Sorgh and Nicolaes Knüpfer and worked in Utrecht. He was possibly the son or nephew of Crijn Hendricksz Volmarijn.

References

Pieter Crijnse Volmarijn on Artnet

1629 births
1679 deaths
Dutch Golden Age painters
Dutch male painters
Painters from Rotterdam